Park Royal Exchange is a major transit exchange in West Vancouver, British Columbia, Canada.  Opened on October 16, 1959, it is located at the Park Royal Shopping Centre and has connections to the Horseshoe Bay Ferry Terminal, the City and District of North Vancouver (including Capilano University), and Vancouver.

Routes

References

External links
Park Royal Exchange map (PDF file)

TransLink (British Columbia) bus stations
Transport in West Vancouver